Malik Isan's Mosque, also known as Isanpur Mosque or Gumle Masjid, is a medieval mosque in Isanpur area of Ahmedabad, India.

History and architecture
The mosque was built by Malik Isan in c.1520. Malik Isan or Isan Sultani 
entitled Nizam-ul-Mulk was a noble in the court of Mahmud Begada. He founded the Isanpur suburb of Ahmedabad.

The whole complex is built on raised platform which can be approached by porches on north and east side. The courtyard is square and the mosque is situated on the west side. The façade of the mosque is divided in three parts each covered with equal sized domes. The central part is raised than two side domes. The tomb of Malik Isan is situated opposite to the mosque.

The mosque was damaged in 2001 Gujarat earthquake and was again vandalised during 2002 Gujarat violence. The structure is further threatened by encroachments.

References 

Mosques in Ahmedabad
Monuments of National Importance in Gujarat